This Is Music is an American music television series which was broadcast on the DuMont Television Network.

Overview
This Is Music was broadcast live from Chicago, and hosted by Alexander Gray. It was only one of several DuMont Network series to be broadcast from Chicago. Others included The Al Morgan Show, Concert Tonight, Chicagoland Mystery Players, Music From Chicago, They Stand Accused, The Music Show, Windy City Jamboree, and the Emmy-nominated game show Down You Go. Each of these series were broadcast from DuMont affiliate WGN-TV over the DuMont Network during the early 1950s.

Due to the large number of musical series broadcast from WGN-TV during the early years of television, it is not exactly clear which performers appeared regularly on This Is Music, and kinescope recordings do not exist for most DuMont Network series. According to McNeil (1996), regulars included Colin Male and Alexander Gray. According to Brooks and Marsh (2007), the series was hosted by Alexander Gray, and regulars included Nancy Carr, Bruce Foote, Lucille Reed, Jackie Van, Jacqueline James, Bill Snary and the series featured the Robert Trendler Orchestra.

Broadcast history
The DuMont series ran from November 1951 to October 1952, and aired on Thursday nights at 8pm (ET) during most of its run, but changed to 10pm during the summer of 1952.

Episode status
Two episodes of the DuMont series are in the collection of the UCLA Film and Television Archive, and two episodes are in the collection of the Paley Center for Media.

Not to be confused with ...
The DuMont show is not to be confused with:
 An ABC Television program with the same title This Is Music, 1958–1959;
 The similarly named syndicated program This Is Your Music, 1955; or
 The name used in the United States and Canada, This Is Music, when airing the 1972 British television program Tony Bennett at the Talk of the Town, during 1974 and 1976 respectively.

See also
List of programs broadcast by the DuMont Television Network
List of surviving DuMont Television Network broadcasts
1951-52 United States network television schedule
The Music Show
Music From Chicago
Concert Tonight

References

Bibliography
David Weinstein, The Forgotten Network: DuMont and the Birth of American Television (Philadelphia: Temple University Press, 2004) 
Alex McNeil, Total Television, Fourth edition (New York: Penguin Books, 1980) 
Tim Brooks and Earle Marsh, The Complete Directory to Prime Time Network TV Shows, Third edition (New York: Ballantine Books, 1964)

External links

DuMont historical website

1951 American television series debuts
1952 American television series endings
1950s American music television series
Black-and-white American television shows
English-language television shows
DuMont Television Network original programming